The following is a list of diss tracks, songs the primary purpose of which is to verbally attack someone else, usually another artist.

Traditional recordings

YouTube
These diss tracks are known for their distribution via the YouTube platform, often because they were made by YouTubers. Although created by entertainers outside of the traditional music industry, these songs found significant audiences, RIAA certifications, and news coverage outside the platform.

References

 
diss tracks
Dynamic lists of songs
Music controversies